This article provides details of international football games played by the Russia national football team from 2020 to present.

On 28 February 2022, due to the 2022 Russian invasion of Ukraine and in accordance with a recommendation by the International Olympic Committee (IOC), FIFA and UEFA suspended the participation of Russia. The Russian Football Union unsuccessfully appealed the FIFA and UEFA bans to the Court of Arbitration for Sport, which upheld the bans.

Results

2020

2021

2022
On 2 May 2022, UEFA announced that Russia were suspended and automatically relegated to League C due to their country's invasion of Ukraine.

2023

Venues in Russia
Included UEFA Euro 2020 Russia matches

Notes

See also
 Russia national football team results (1992–2019)

References

2020s in Russia
Russia national football team results